Sheykhi Zirdu (also Romanized as Sheykhī Zīrdū and Sheykhī Zīr Do; also known as Karia-yi-Shaikhi, Karīyeh-ye Sheykhī, and Sheykhī) is a Zirdu village in Rostam-e Yek Rural District, in the Central District of Rostam County, Fars Province, Iran. At the 2006 census, its population was 249, in 48 families.

References 

Populated places in Rostam County